This list of hills of the Schönbuch contains an almost complete selection of the hills, high points and spurs or subpeaks of the Schönbuch, a forest region in the south German Keuper Uplands, and of the Schönbuch Nature Park within the German state of Baden-Württemberg.

The table below is organised in order of height in metres above sea level (NHN), but some of the columns are sortable by clicking on the symbol in the respective header.

The abbreviations used in the table are explained below.

Abbreviations and key 
The abbreviations used in the table (alphabetically sorted) mean:

The Part of column usually gives details of the local  nature reserve, which is almost never on the hilltop, but on its sides or at its foot. The area in hectares, height in metres (m) above Normalhöhennull (NHN) and the date of foundation are given.

See also 
 List of mountains and hills of Baden-Württemberg

References 

!
Schonbuch
!